Ayaspaşa, also known as Ayazpaşa, is a quarter of Beyoğlu district in Istanbul, Turkey. It is close to Taksim Square and the neighbourhoods of Gümüşsuyu and Cihangir.

Quarters of Beyoğlu